John Toohey may refer to:

 John Toohey (judge) (1930–2015), Australian judge
 John Toohey (politician) (1839–1903), Australian brewer and politician
 John Toohey (American football), American football player
 John Peter Toohey (1880–1946), American writer and publicist
 John Toohey (bishop) (died 1975), Australian Roman Catholic priest and bishop of Maitland